Heinz 57 is a synecdoche of the historical advertising slogan "57 Varieties" by the H. J. Heinz Company located in Pittsburgh, Pennsylvania, United States.  It was developed from the marketing campaign that told consumers about the numerous products available from the Heinz company.

Usage

Henry J. Heinz introduced the marketing slogan "57 pickle Varieties" in 1896. He later claimed he was inspired by an advertisement he saw while riding an elevated train in New York City (a shoe store boasting "21 styles"). The reason for "57" is unclear. Heinz said he chose "5" because it was his lucky number and the number "7" was his wife's lucky number. However, Heinz also said the number "7" was selected specifically because of the "psychological influence of that figure and of its enduring significance to people of all ages". Whatever the reasons, Heinz wanted the company to advertise the greatest number of choices of pickles. In fact by 1892, four years before the slogan was created, the Heinz company was already selling more than 60 products.

The first product to be promoted under the new "57 varieties" slogan was prepared horseradish. By 1940, the term "Heinz 57" had become so synonymous with the company the name was used to market a steak sauce.

1934 Cookbook products

 Heinz Oven-Baked Beans – Pork and Tomato Sauce
 Heinz Oven-Baked Beans – Pork no Tomato Sauce
 Heinz Oven-Baked Beans – Tomato Sauce no Pork
 Heinz Oven-Baked Red Kidney Beans
 Heinz Cream of Asparagus Soup
 Heinz Cream of Celery Soup
 Heinz Cream of Mushroom
 Heinz Cream of Green Pea Soup
 Heinz Cream of Oyster
 Heinz Cream of Tomato Soup
 Heinz Bean Soup
 Heinz Beef Broth
 Heinz Clam Chowder
 Heinz Gumbo Creole
 Heinz Mock Turtle Soup
 Heinz Scotch Broth
 Heinz Noodle Soup
 Heinz Pepper Pot Soup
 Heinz Vegetable Soup
 Heinz Consommé
 Heinz Onion Soup
 Heinz Mince Meat
 Heinz Puddings—Date, Fig, and Plum
 Heinz Peanut Butter
 Heinz Cooked Spaghetti
 Heinz Cooked Macaroni
 Heinz Pure Jellies
 Heinz Apple Butter
 Heinz Gherkins—Sweet or Sour
 Heinz Mixed Pickles—Sweet or Sour
 Heinz Chow Chow Pickle
 Heinz Sweet Mustard Pickle
 Heinz Dill Pickles
 Heinz Fresh Cucumber Pickle
 Heinz Strained Foods
 Heinz India Relish
 Heinz Sandwich Spread
 Heinz Pickled Onions—Sweet and Sour
 Heinz Spanish Queen Olives
 Heinz Stuffed Spanish Olives
 Heinz Ripe Olives
 Heinz Pure Spanish Olive Oil
 Heinz Tomato Ketchup
 Heinz Chili Sauce
 Heinz Beefsteak Sauce*
 Heinz Pepper Sauce—Red or Green
 Heinz Worcestershire Sauce
 Heinz Prepared Mustard—Brown or Yellow
 Heinz Evaporated Horseradish
 Heinz Mayonnaise
 Heinz Pure Malt Vinegar
 Heinz Pure Cider Vinegar
 Heinz Distilled White Vinegar
 Heinz Tarragon Vinegar
 Heinz Rice Flakes
 Heinz Breakfast Wheat
 Heinz Tomato Juice
*- Known today as Heinz 57 Sauce.

Bottle design

The relatively high viscosity and thixotropic nature of ketchup can make pouring it from a glass bottle somewhat difficult and unpredictable, and several urban legends surrounding this phenomenon have arisen. According to one popular folk remedy, repeatedly hitting the "57" mark on a glass Heinz ketchup bottle makes the ketchup pour out more quickly and easily. The New York Times suggests this is a matter of intentional design, with Heinz having placed the "57" mark on that particular spot of the bottle as a target for consumers to hit. According to the Heinz website, only 11% of people know this trick.

In popular culture
In bingo in the United Kingdom, a commonly used call for "57" is "Heinz variety".

In draw poker, "Heinz 57" is a variant where 5s and 7s are wild cards.

In UK betting terminology, a 'Heinz' refers to a full-cover bet of doubles and upwards, consisting of six selections.  It is known as a Heinz because there are 57 multiples (15 doubles, 20 trebles, 15 fourfolds, 6 fivefolds and 1 sixfold) within the bet.

The Heinz 57 is also a nickname for British Rail Class 57 locomotives.

When Pittsburgh-based Heinz purchased the naming rights of Heinz Field in 2001, they signed a deal to pay the Pittsburgh Steelers $57 million until 2021.

Heinz 57 figures in the plot of the novel The Manchurian Candidate when antagonist Mrs. Iselin lights upon a bottle of the product and adopts the number as an easy one for husband Senator John Iselin to remember as the number of Communists he charges with being employed by the State Department. The 1962 film adaptation retains this, with a bottle of Heinz 57 sauce appearing on-screen moments before John Iselin cites the number in a speech.

Former NHL player Steve Heinze requested to wear #57 when he was drafted by the Boston Bruins. However, the Bruins general manager Harry Sinden denied his request, stating that only Ray Bourque (#77) could wear an unorthodox number. Instead, Heinze wore #23 in Boston. He was granted #57 when he joined the Columbus Blue Jackets and he wore it for the remainder of his NHL career.

References

External links

The story of "57 Varieties"
"Heinz Fun Facts" Wayback Machine Archive

Brand name condiments
Heinz
American advertising slogans
Metaphors referring to food and drink
Steak sauces
Products introduced in 1896
1890s neologisms